Rany Jazayerli (born June 14, 1975), a Chicago-area dermatologist, is a co-founder of and writer for Baseball Prospectus. He developed the statistical concept of Pitcher Abuse Points (PAP), which relates to high pitch counts in baseball.

Jazayerli is a graduate of Johns Hopkins University and the University of Michigan School of Medicine. He is a board-certified dermatologist and a Fellow of the American Academy of Dermatology.

Works
Since 1996 Jazayerli has co-authored many of the annual Baseball Prospectus volumes.  He also writes occasional “Doctoring the Numbers” columns for BaseballProspectus.com in which he investigates topics from a sabermetric perspective. He is the creator of the sabermetric measure of "Pitcher Abuse Points."  Jazayerli has published seminal research on the relative merits of the 4-man and 5-man pitching rotation.  His most important recent major research contribution is a series of twelve articles published on BaseballProspectus.com in 2005-2006 reporting a massive study of the changing patterns of the Major League Baseball player draft.

He and Rob Neyer of ESPN co-authored a blog called “Rob & Rany on the Royals,” in which they both would lament the performance of the Kansas City Royals major league franchise. He now writes his own blog, "Rany on the Royals,". Since 2011 he has been a contributing writer to Grantland.

He has also contributed essays on politics to FiveThirtyEight.com.

Plea for tolerance
Shortly after the 9/11 terrorist attacks, Jazayerli wrote a “Plea for Tolerance” on ESPN.com’s “Page 2”.  In his plea, Jazayerli observed:  “I have been a baseball writer for over six years, and hardly a day goes by that I don't count my blessings for the opportunity to write about the most uniquely American pastime. But today I can't afford to think about our Great American Game, because I'm too busy thinking about what it means to be an American.  You see, I am a Muslim. I am an Arab-American. And right now I am scared to death that in a country I have loved all my life — in the only country I have ever called my own — I am no longer truly free. I feel imprisoned by the hatred of others, those blind to the difference between a sick, demented terrorist and a peace-loving American . . . . Today, I hope that the accomplishments of Muslim and Arab athletes in this country, both on and off the field, will help remind us of the basic humanity in people of all backgrounds. I hope that people might reflect on the charisma and genius of a Muhammad Ali, or the grace of a Hakeem Olajuwon, and understand that just as Muslim athletes are committed to the same goals, on and off the field, as their fellow athletes, so too are Muslims in this country as innately American as anyone else.”

Notes

External links
Rany on the Royals

Baseball statisticians
Jazayerli, Rany
Jazayerli, Rany
Jazayerli, Rany
1975 births
American people of Syrian descent
American Muslims
Living people
American dermatologists